S. S. Balan (or S. Balasubramanian) (28 December 1935 19 December 2014) was an Indian journalist, filmmaker, political analyst, and media personality as well as internationally famous aviculturalist and agriculturalist. He was a dominant force in Indian media over six decades having been at the helm of Ananda Vikatan magazine as editor and managing director as well as managing director of the erstwhile Gemini Studios since the 1950s. He was the son of media baron S. S. Vasan. He was chairman emeritus of the Vikatan Group having retired from active involvement at the helm of the media conglomerate.

Early life and education 
Born in Madras, on 28 December 1935, Balan grew up studying in Presentation Convent, Church Park and P.S. High School before going on to complete his B.Com at Loyola College in Madras. With a keen interest in cricket, he was part of many local league and college league matches. Balan indulged in his pastime of animals, birds and wildlife with a multitude of pets that grew into serious hobbies later in life. Born to S. S. Vasan and Pattammal Vasan, Balan was the second child and only son, with an older sister Lakshmi Narayani. The family lived on Edward Eliots Road that later became Radhakrishnan Salai in a heritage home that has now given way to an office building. Dominated by the growth of cinema and media, Balan was groomed to take on the mantle of running the Gemini and Vikatan companies by his father being made the joint managing director at 19 on 26 August 1956. With a penchant for the camera and pen alike, Balan had successful innings alongside his father and later took over the reins of the media empire on his father's demise on 26 August 1969.

Magazine career 
Ananda Vikatan, the flagship weekly magazine of Vasan Publications was founded in 1926 and bought in 1928 by the late media mogul S. S. Vasan. It is one of the top-ranked publications in Tamil (in readership, respect and influence), it is also one of the oldest vernacular magazines in the world with around half a million readers. In the eight decades of family ownership, Vikatan rose to pre-eminence across the Tamil speaking populations and that has identified, introduced and nurtured some of the finest talent in Indian media, literature and arts. Balan has the distinction of having been the editor, publisher and managing director of the group for 50 years before he retired in 2006 to become chairman emeritus of the group. Balan entered Ananda Vikatan as joint managing director and joint chief editor on 26 August 1956 and became managing director of the organisation on 26 August 1969 on the death of his father S. S. Vasan. Due to his powerful position as managing director of both Ananda Vikatan and Gemini Studios, he earned the moniker "M.D." amongst Chennai media circles in the 1970s.

It was under his leadership that some of the finest achievements of the group happened including the birth of Junior Vikatan, a pioneering magazine in investigative journalism that till today commands the attention of all seekers of political and investigative news in Tamil Nadu. Junior Vikatan is a bi-weekly publication that focuses on crime, politics and other bold topics. It has uncovered many cases that have rocked the state like the Auto Shankar serial killings and others. The magazine is known for its brave stand as a watchdog over events occurring in the state. His bold guidance took the magazines from height to height and a crowning achievement of his that galvanised the entire global media fraternity behind him was when the Privileges Committee of the Tamil Nadu Legislative Assembly ordered him to be sent to prison for publishing a cartoon satire on the front cover  of Ananda Vikatan in 1987. As editor, he took on the wrongful act of the Tamil Nadu Legislature in court and in a historical judgement, won a case against the state legislature. He continued to fight for the freedom of the press and expression throughout his tenure as editor. Ananda Vikatan also championed many social causes powerfully. It became one of the first media houses to refuse to print advertisements of tobacco products and cigarettes in the 1980s when it was first proved that smoking caused cancer even before this was legally required. These were personal initiatives by Balan who has inspired many to walk on the path of charity and service without advertisement – one of those he inspired was the famous philanthropist and social worker Kalyana Sundaram who has been hailed as a national treasure. Contributing immensely to Tamil journalism, Balan created a mentorship program for student journalists and has helped bring many generations of media professionals into the field by his expert guidance. He is widely known and respected by the media fraternity for having been a mentor to senior editors, journalists, media professionals, writers etc. and having encouraged, assisted and even funded the growth of a large number of other media organisations and publications such as helping his friend Cho Ramaswamy launch Thuglak magazine. He has also maintained a record of non-alignment and a policy of objectivity (politically and commercially) in all spheres to maintain a bold stand in the media without obligations, shying away from personal publicity. S Balan mentored various famous writers in Tamil such as Manian, Shivashankari, Sujatha, Balakumaran, Crazy Mohan, Madhan, Rajesh Kumar and more. He has quietly inspired many people with his ideals, values, convictions and persuasive opinions. Vikatan also publishes books and now is a group that puts out nine magazines in Tamil and was one of the first in the country to adopt computerised typesetting and to go digital. A significant achievement was the publication of the Tamil version of the concise Encyclopædia Britannica. However, after Balasubramanian stepped down from the editorial position of the group at 70, the content of the magazines and altered presentation has come under flak from its readers. However, it is commendable that the magazine has survived for more than eight decades, specifically with the stabilising influence and dynamism of Balan's leadership for over fifty years that has allowed it to reinvent itself.

Novels 
S.S. Balan also wrote some successful novels and serial stories under the pen name Sevarkodiyon, expamples include Un Kannil Neer Vazhindhaal and Pesum Porchitthirame. A devoted fan of Bharathiyar, most of his novels' titles are from lines of Subramanya Bharathi's immortal poetry. Most of his plots have revolved around intricate love-triangles.

Film career 
Being the only son of a media mogul meant training to step into the shoes of a similar role in life, Balan, being the son of S. S. Vasan not only took on his responsibilities seriously, he carved his own path to distinction in a variety of ways from a young age. Being handed the reigns of the erstwhile Gemini Studios, Gemini Picture Circuit, Ananda Vikatan, Gemini Color Lab and others, needed him to steer the many speeding horses. Gemini Studios, was one of the most advanced film studios in Asia, organised along the lines of Hollywood with its productions hitting the mark all over India breaking language barriers. The Gemini Picture Circuit reigned as the biggest distributors of films in India during the 1950s and 1960s. The Gemini Color Lab was one of the most successful labs in South Asia and only the second one after Kodak's Lab in Bombay at the time.

The Gemini-Vikatan umbrella was one of the earliest media organisations that sought to be a professionally managed and the first instance of a vertically integrated organisation in Asia. Initially, as joint managing director along with his father S. S. Vasan and later as managing director of the media empire, Balan brought soul and substance to the films made under the Gemini banner by writing, producing and then directing more than 30 films in six languages. The film he first worked on and scripted was the Hindi film Grihasti in 1955 starring Ashok Kumar. This was later remade in Tamil as Motor Sundaram Pillai starring Shivaji Ganesan along with an ensemble cast and was the directorial debut of Balan. Some of the films he made not only were highly successful and memorable, but they also went on to establish the careers of many new talents introduced into the film industry such as Amitabh Bachchan (his first starring role in the unsuccessful Sanjog, 1970), Jayalalitha (Motor Sundaram Pillai), Ravichandran (Motor Sundaram Pillai), Rajesh Khanna (Aurat), Shivakumar (Motor Sundaram Pillai) etc. to name a few.  Leading the cause for industry status recognition in the country for films, Vasan and Balan resolved to say no to cash dealings in film/media production to bring in transparency at a time when it was unheard of half a century ago. When the studio system itself came under siege in the late 1960s, Mr Balan pioneered independent film financing and helped many emerging filmmakers establish themselves successfully outside the studios by providing guidance, production design and packages to assist them. He ran the media empire successfully while his father, S.S. Vasan who was nominated to the Rajya Sabha as a member of parliament from 1964 till his death in 1969 could focus on his parliamentary duties in Delhi. In the mid-1970s, the colossal failure of his magnum opus in four languages (Hindi, Tamil and Telugu) titled Ellorum Nallavare precipitated the shut down of the Gemini Studios. In the early 1980s with the decline of the studio system, Balan sought to focus on publishing and sold the film company and its assets while retaining Vasan Publications/Ananda Vikatan. One of the last films directed by him was Nishan in Bengali starring Uttam Kumar in 1978. As producer, writer and director, films made by S. S. Balan include, Grihasthi, Gharana, Aurat, Motor Sundaram Pillai, Nishan (1978 film), Olivilakku, Teen Bahuraniyan, Lakhon Mein Ek, Sanjog, Shatranj, Siriththu Vaazha Vendum, Nishaan, Maadaivam and  Ellorum Nallavare. He has directed and worked on films with many top actors in India across Tamil, Hindi, Telugu, Kannada and Bengali, including MGR, NTR, Shivaji Ganesan, Muthuraman, Raj Kumar, Rajendra Kumar, Prithviraj Kapoor, Mehmood, Amitabh Bacchan and Rajesh Khanna.

Other 
Balasubramanian has also scored many accomplishments in other fields. A passion for agriculture and farming led to the pursuit of this for over six decades and setting up of Gemini Farms in Padappai. Notably, his personal agricultural pursuit has included an international exposure and association with the farms under him being categorised model farms that have routinely tested new crop varieties for companies. His penchant for meticulous detail, logical innovativeness and management, filter down to the very last of his employees and even the Planning Commission of India has at various times studied his highly productive and practical methods for bringing in the next wave of green revolution. Balasubramanian also created the Gemini Agro Technical Educational (GATE) Foundation that brings farmers from across regions to his farms to study agricultural techniques for free.

An avid animal, fish and bird enthusiast, Balan is an expert breeder consistently breaking records and is one of the eminent aviculturists and bird breeders in the world. He maintains one of the largest bird farms in South Asia, Gemini Bird Farm, set in the Padappai region with a vast variety of exotic birds and parrots. The farm regularly donates birds to the Chennai zoo. A speciality of his breeding is of colour mutations of ringneck parrots, palm cockatoos (endangered species and notoriously difficult to breed), macaws and more.

Personal life 
Balan was married to Saroja Balan and they had seven children, six daughters and one son, B. Srinivasan who is now the managing director of the Vikatan Group. His mother, Pattamal Vasan continued to be a dominant force in his life until her demise in 1996. He died in December 2014 at the age of 78 of a heart attack, survived by wife, five daughters, son and grandchildren. S.S.Balan has a bird sanctuary at Padappai.

References 

Indian male journalists
Loyola College, Chennai alumni
1936 births
2014 deaths
Writers from Chennai
Indian male novelists
21st-century Indian novelists
20th-century Indian novelists
Novelists from Tamil Nadu
20th-century Indian male writers
21st-century Indian male writers